This is a list of Billboard magazine's ranking of the top country singles of 1968. 

The ranking was based on performance on the Billboard Country Chart during the period from January 6, 1968, to August 31, 1968. Accordingly, the list excludes songs like (i) "Stand by Your Man", which was released in September 1968 and held the No. 1 spot for three consecutive weeks from November 23 to December 7, and (ii) "Mama Tried", which held the No. 1 spot for four consecutive weeks from August 31 to September 21.

See also
List of Hot Country Singles number ones of 1968
List of Billboard Hot 100 number ones of 1968
1968 in country music

Notes

References

1968 record charts
Billboard charts
1968 in American music